Zara Grigoryevna Mints (July 24, 1927 – October 25, 1990) was a Slavic literary scientist active in the University of Tartu. She was the wife of Juri Lotman.

Mints was born in Pskov, but the family soon moved to Leningrad. Her mother Frida Abramovna Sinderikhina (1889?–1939) was a stomatologist, father Girsh Yefremovich Mints was an administrator of Volgograd Sanitary Inspection facility.

She went to high school 1935–1941 in Leningrad, was evacuated to Yaroslavl Oblast and later to Chelyabinsk during World War II. She entered Leningrad University in 1944.

Already during her student years, she began to specialize in Aleksandr Blok's works. Although she graduated cum laude, she couldn't start the postgraduate studies due to the anti-semitic campaign of the late 1940s and the beginning of the 1950s. Initially working as a Russian teacher, she went to Tartu with her husband (they had married in 1951), where she could start her career as a university lecturer. From 1955, she worked at the department of Russian literature. Mints became a professor in 1979.

On 21 November 1972 she defended her Doctor's thesis (Aleksandr Blok i russkaja realisticheskaja literatura XIX veka – Aleksandr Blok and Russian Realist Literature of the 19th Century), but the All-Union Higher Assessment Commission did not give her the degree until five years later. Mints' courses chiefly covered the Russian literature of the 19th century and the beginning of the 20th century (Dostoyevsky, Chekhov, Blok, e.g. connections between Blok's works and the general cultorological questions).

Mints took actively part in collecting Blok's literary heritage and publishing the monograph Aleksandr Blok: Novye materialy i issledovanija – A.B.: New Materials and studies, 5 Volumes, Moscow 1980–1987. She died in Bergamo, Italy.

See also
Juri Lotman
Mihhail Lotman
Aleksei Lotman

Bibliography
 Лавров А. В. Александр Блок в трудах и днях З. Г. Минц // Минц З. Г. Блок и русский символизм: избранные труды: в трех книгах. [Т. 2], Александр Блок и русские писатели. Санкт-Петербург, 2000. С. 7–20.

References

1927 births
1990 deaths
Soviet philologists
Women philologists
Women linguists
Soviet Jews
People from Pskov
Writers from Saint Petersburg
Academic staff of the University of Tartu
Burials at Raadi cemetery
20th-century philologists